Kingdom is the sixth studio album by Japanese singer-songwriter Kumi Koda. It was released on January 30, 2008, a week after her single anytime. The album debuted at No. 1 on the Oricon Weekly Charts with sales of 421,302. It remained on the charts for thirty-three weeks. The album was released in four editions: CD, CD+DVD, CD+2DVD and CD+2DVD+Poster, with limited editions of all versions carrying the bonus track Black Cherry.

Kingdom has been certified triple platinum by RIAJ for shipment of 750,000 copies in Japan.

Information
Kingdom is Japanese singer-songwriter Koda Kumi's sixth studio album and tenth album overall. It was released on January 30, 2008, a little over a year after her previous studio album, Black Cherry. The album was her fourth consecutive album to claim the No. 1 spot on the Oricon Albums Charts, continuing her streak, which began in early 2005 with her Best ~first things~ album. It contained new material and was her first album to have music videos for every song – including the introduction. She would later do this again for her 2012 album Japonesque.

The album was available in four versions: CD, CD+DVD, CD+2DVD and a limited edition CD+2DVD+Poster. The first DVD featured sixteen music videos for each song on the album, including the music video for the non-album song "Run For Your Life." The second DVD was of her Premium Live in Hall in Yokohama Arena concert performed at the Yokohama Arena in Yokohama on June 20, 2007, which was done in part to promote her first pachinko game, Fever Live in Hall. The CD+2DVD edition contained a slip cover, three stickers of the different album covers and a booklet, which contained photos of the concert. The album's artwork was to symbolize Kumi's popularity in the Japanese music industry at the time, with Kumi donning a crown and sitting on a throne.

Packaging
Kingdom was available in four editions:

CD: contains fourteen musical tracks.
CD+DVD: contains fourteen musical tracks, fifteen music videos and the live video for Black Cherry, which was performed during her Live Tour 2007 ~Black Cherry~ at Tokyo Dome.
CD+2DVD: contains fifteen musical tracks, fifteen music videos with the live video for Black Cherry, her one night show "Premium Limited Live in Hall in Yokohama Arena," which was performed on June 20, 2007, a slipcover for the album and a booklet with images from the one night show.
CD+2DVD+Poster: contains fifteen musical tracks, fifteen music videos with the live video for Black Cherry, her one night show "Premium Limited Live in Hall in Yokohama Arena," a booklet with images from the one night show, a slipcover for the album, three stickers of the album covers and a full-sized poster.

The limited editions of all versions contained the bonus track Black Cherry on the CD, which was the full version of the introduction from her last studio album, Black Cherry.Controversy and cancelled promotion
On January 31, an inflammatory statement by Kumi made on the talk show All Night Nippon created controversy, causing Avex Entertainment (via Koda Kumi's request) to cancel all promotions for Kingdom on February 2. Her website was shut down with a letter from Kumi posted on the page, apologizing for her remark.

During the radio show, Kumi was asked what she thought about her manager's recent marriage, to which she responded lightheartedly, "When women turn 35, their amniotic fluid goes rotten, so I hope they have a child before then." The statement caused backlash due to Japan's low birth rates and the sensitivity of the subject. Due to the statement, she lost promotions for GemCerey, the KOSÉ "Visée" line and Coca-Cola.

Kumi made an appearance on FNN Supernews to apologize for the remark, saying how she deeply regretted hurting thousands of Japanese women and mothers. She also made several public apologies and apologized during her tour for Kingdom.

Despite the backlash, the album still reached No. 1 on Oricon.

In Koda Reki, Kumi's published biography, she said how she still cries when she thinks about the comment and hurting "many Japanese women." She goes on to say how it was that moment in her career when she realized how immature and unprofessional she was, not realizing how many people listened to her words due to her fame. She admitted how she had cancelled several rehearsals for Kingdom's corresponding tour, Live Tour 2008 ~Kingdom~, due to the severe anxiety she would get when she believed that she would walk out onto the stage to perform, only to have an empty arena.

Music videos
The album contained music videos for every song on the CD, including the introduction. It also featured the live version of "Black Cherry," which she performed during her Live Tour 2007 ~Black Cherry~ Special Final in Tokyo Dome. It also featured the non-album music video for "Run For Your Life," which was originally released on her single Freaky in 2007.

Several of the music videos lined up to perform one coherent story line – much as was done during her 12 Singles Collection from her Best ~second session~ era with five of the music videos. Those that lined up where "Koi no Mahou", "Himitsu", "Amai Wana" and "Anata ga shite kurete koto." All four videos contain the same piece of jewelry to signify their connection and story.

The DVD also featured alternate renditions of her music videos "Ai no Uta" and "anytime," both with different scenes not released in their single counterparts.

The second DVD featured Kumi's one night show "Premium Live In Hall," which was performed at Yokohama Hall to help promote her first pachinko game, Fever Live in Hall.Koda Kumi would later release another studio album where every track had corresponding music video for her 2012 album Japonesque.''

Track listing

CD

DVD1: Music Videos

DVD2: Premium Limited Live in Hall in Yokohama Arena

Charts
Oricon Sales Chart (Japan)

Singles

References 

Koda Kumi albums
2008 albums
Avex Group albums